Tongue Peak is a peak rising to about 2,450 m between Holdsworth Glacier and Scott Glacier, 3 nautical miles (6 km) west-northwest of Mount Farley, in the Queen Maud Mountains, Antarctica. The peak was mapped by United States Geological Survey (USGS) from surveys and U.S. Navy aerial photographs, 1960–64. It was geologically mapped by a United States Antarctic Research Program (USARP)-Arizona State University field party, 1978–79, and was named by geologist Scott G. Borg, a member of the party. The name derives from a well-developed tongue-shaped moraine in an abandoned cirque between the west and north ridges of the peak.

Mountains of the Ross Dependency
Amundsen Coast